Dubai Spice Souk or the Old Souk is a traditional market (or souk) in Dubai, United Arab Emirates (UAE). The Spice Souk is located in Deira, in eastern Dubai, and is adjacent to the Dubai Gold Souk. The Spice Souk is in the locality of Al Ras, on Baniyas Street. The souk comprises several narrow lanes which are lined with open and closed-roof stores, and is a tourist attraction. 

Stores in the Spice Souk sell a variety of fragrances and spices from frankincense and shisha to the many herbs used in Arabic and South Asian food. In addition, several household, textiles, tea, incense, rugs and artifacts are also sold in the Spice Souk. A majority of the trading occurs through haggling. The quantity of trade as well as the number of stores trading spices in the Spice Souk have hanged in recent years due to the growth of larger stores and supermarkets.

References

External links 
 Video of the Spice Souk on YouTube
 Deira Spice Souk on lonely planet

Retail markets in the United Arab Emirates
Economy of Dubai
Tourist attractions in Dubai

Tourist attractions in the United Arab Emirates